(1920–1952 Petrovice;) is a municipality and village in Karviná District in the Moravian-Silesian Region of the Czech Republic. It has about 4,900 inhabitants.

Administrative parts

Villages of Dolní Marklovice, Prstná and Závada are administrative parts of Petrovice u Karviné.

Etymology
The name is patronymic in origin, derived from the personal name Petr/Piotr, meaning "Petr's village". Petrovice was renamed Petrovice u Karviné after the extension of the municipality in 1952.

Geography
Petrovice u Karviné lies in the historical region of Cieszyn Silesia on the border with Poland.

The Petrůvka River flows through the municipality and forms a part of the Czech-Polish border. It enters the Olza in Závada. The Szotkówka Stream springs in Prstná. There are several ponds in the municipality.

History
The first written mention of Petrovice is from 1335, when it was mentioned as a seat of a Catholic parish in an incomplete register of Peter's Pence payment as villa Petri. The oldest part of the municipality is Dolní Marklovice, which was first mentioned in Liber fundationis episcopatus Vratislaviensis from around 1305. Politically, the area belonged initially to the Duchy of Teschen. Petrovice was again mentioned in the register of Peter's Pence payment from 1447 among the 50 parishes of Teschen deanery as Petirsdorff.

After the 1540s Protestant Reformation prevailed in the Duchy of Teschen and a local Catholic church was taken over by Lutherans. It was taken from them (as one from around fifty buildings in the region) by a special commission and given back to the Roman Catholic Church on 14 April 1654.

After the Revolutions of 1848 in the Austrian Empire, a modern municipal division was introduced in the re-established Austrian Silesia. The village as a municipality was subscribed at least since 1880 to political district and legal district of Freistadt.

According to the censuses conducted in 1880–1910 the population of the municipality grew from 1,022 in 1880 to 1,444 in 1910. In terms of the language the majority were Polish-speakers (at least 82.8% in 1880, at most 91.3% in 1900), accompanied by German-speakers (at least 6.7% in 1900, at most 15% in 1880) and Czech-speakers (at most 2.6% in 1910). In terms of religion, in 1910 the majority were Roman Catholics (1,410 or 97.6%), followed by Protestants (20 or 1.4%) and Jews (14 or 1%).

After World War I, the Polish–Czechoslovak War and the division of Cieszyn Silesia in 1920, the municipality became a part of Czechoslovakia. Following the Munich Agreement, in October 1938 together with the Zaolzie region it was invaded by Polish army and annexed by Poland, administratively organised in Frysztat County of Silesian Voivodeship. The municipality was then annexed by Nazi Germany at the beginning of World War II. After the war it was restored to Czechoslovakia.

In 1952, the municipalities of Dolní Marklovice, Prstná and Závada were merged with Petrovice.

Demographics
Petrovice u Karviné is one of the most populated municipalities without the town status in the Czech Republic. Polish minority made up 12.8% of the population in 2011, but it dropped to 6.8% in 2021. Around 23.4% of the population is religious (mostly Roman-Catholic), which is about the double of the national average.

Transport

Petrovice u Karviné is a railway junction and the site of an important railway border crossing to Zebrzydowice in Poland. There are also three road border crossings and two pedestrian border crossings.

Sport
In Petrovice u Karviné is a motocross racetrack.

Sights

The parish Church of Saint Martin Church dates from 1789. It replaced an old wooden church.

The wooden Church of the Assumption of the Lord in Dolní Marklovice is a timbered church from 1739 with a conical gable tower. It is part of an exceptional group of Silesian wooden churches. In the interior there is a unique decorative painting from the mid-18th century.

Petrovice Castle is an Empire style château, built after 1796. It was built in the middle on an English park. Today it is a hotel.

Twin towns – sister cities

Petrovice u Karviné is twinned with:
 Godów, Poland
 Zebrzydowice, Poland

References

External links

 
News TV info portal 

Villages in Karviná District
Cieszyn Silesia